Limbani District is one of ten districts of the province Sandia in Peru.

Geography 
Some of the highest mountains of the district are listed below:

 Ankayuq K'uchu
 Ariquma
 Ch'uxñaquta 
 K'ark'a Chunta
 Puka Pukayuq
 Q'alawaña
 Surapata Urqu
 Warachani
 Wirta Pata
 Yana Urqu

Ethnic groups 
The people in the district are mainly indigenous citizens of Quechua descent. Quechua is the language which the majority of the population (60.58%) learnt to speak in childhood, 38.52% of the residents started speaking using the Spanish language (2007 Peru Census).

References